Clivina oregona is a species of ground beetle in the subfamily Scaritinae. It was described by Fall in 1922.

References

oregona
Beetles described in 1922